Lophostemon ('lophos' - crest, 'stemon' - stamen) is a genus of 4 species of evergreen tree in the myrtle family Myrtaceae. All four species are native to Australia, with one extending to New Guinea. The genus was first described in 1830 but not widely recognized  until the 1980s. All 4 species were previously included in the related genus Tristania.

The most well-known species, L. confertus is a familiar tree to many people living along the east coast of Australia, where it known colloquially as the brush box. Quite frequently, it has been planted as a street tree, a role it isn't suited for as it grows to 30 metres in height and quite often suffers lopping due to obstructing overhead power lines.

Lophostemon species are used as food plants by the larvae of some Lepidoptera species including Aenetus ligniveren.

Species
 Lophostemon confertus (R.Br.) Peter G.Wilson & J.T.Waterh. - (Brush Box, Queensland Box, Brisbane Box) Queensland, New South Wales
 Lophostemon grandiflorus (Benth.) Peter G.Wilson & J.T.Waterh. - (Northern Swamp Box) Queensland, Northern Territory, Western Australia
 Lophostemon lactifluus  (F.Muell.) Peter G.Wilson & J.T.Waterh. - (Milky Box) Northern Territory, Western Australia
 Lophostemon suaveolens (Sol. ex Gaertn.) Peter G.Wilson & J.T.Waterh. - (Swamp Mahogany, Swamp Turpentine, Swamp Box) Queensland, New South Wales, New Guinea

References

Myrtaceae
Myrtaceae genera
Myrtales of Australia